Elisabeth Kontomanou (born 30 November 1961) is a French jazz singer and composer who has lived in America and Sweden.

Life
Kontomanou was born in Sète (France) in 1961. She moved to New York in the 1990s and then on to Stockholm where she was based when she recorded Back to My Groove. This album includes covers of songs which she sings in English.

In 1986, she founded the quartet Conversation, which won the La Défense Jazz Festival competition. In 1986, she was hired by Michel Legrand for the movie Moon Mask while the pianist Alain Jean-Marie organized her tour of the Antilles. In 1995, she went to New York.  Ten years later, she moved to Paris, where she composed the song "Waiting for Spring" and the album Back to My Groove. In 2008 she released the album Brewin' the Blues.

In 2006 and 2014, she appeared at the Montreal International Jazz Festival. In 2013, she appeared at the Tan Jazz Festival.

In 2006, she won the Vocal Jazz Award of the Victoires du Jazz.

Kontomanou has worked with Michel Legrand, Mike Stern, John Scofield, Alain Jean-Marie, Jean-Michel Pilc, Daryl Hall, Franck Amsallem, Toots Thielemans, Richard Bona, Stéphane Belmondo, Jacques Schwarz-Bart, Leon Parker, and Geri Allen.

Discography 
 1998 – Embrace
 2000 – Hands and Incantation 
 2004 – Midnight Sun
 2005 – Waitin' for Spring
 2005 – A Week in Paris (A Tribute to Billy Strayhorn)
 2007 – Back to My Groove
 2008 – Brewin' the Blues
 2009 – Siren Song – Live at Arsenal
 2012 - Secret of the Wind with Geri Allen
 2014 - Amoureuse

References

 

1961 births
Living people
Musicians from Lyon
French jazz singers
French women jazz singers